The 2006–07 WRU Division Two East or 2006–07 Asda Division Two East for sponsorship reasons was the twelfth season of the WRU Division Two and the  first season of the WRU Division Two East. The season began on Saturday 2 September 2006 and ended on Saturday 5 May 2007. Twelve teams played each other on a home and away basis. This was also the last season where teams earned three points for a win and one point for a draw.

Table

Results

Matchday 1

Matchday 2

Matchday 3

Matchday 4

Matchday 5

Matchday 6

Matchday 7 (5/6)

Matchday 8

Matchday 9 (4/6)

Matchday 10 (3/6)

Matchday 11 (2/6)

Matchday 12 (5/6)

Matchday 13 (3/6)

Matchday 14

Matchday 15

Matchday 16

Mixed matchdays

Matchday 18 (5/6)

Matchday 17 (4/6)

Matchday 11 (3/6)

Matchday 19

Matchday 20

Matchday 21

Matchday 7 (6/6)

Matchday 22

Mixed matchdays

Mixed matchdays

Matchday 11 (6/6)

Mixed matchdays

Matchday 18 (6/6)

Matchday 13 (6/6)

2006–07 in Welsh rugby union
Wales 1